Coraline, also known as Coraline: The Game and Coraline: An Adventure Too Weird for Words, is an adventure game based on the film of the same name. It was released on January 27, 2009, in close proximity to the film's theatrical release. It was released on the PlayStation 2, Wii and Nintendo DS.

Development
The game's score was composed and produced by Mark Watters. The score was recorded and mixed by Tim Bryson at Robert Irving Studios (based in Woodland Hills, Los Angeles) and Watter Music (based in Chatsworth, Los Angeles). The only three actors to reprise their roles from the film are Dakota Fanning as Coraline, Keith David as the Cat and Robert Bailey Jr. as Wyborn "Wybie" Lovat. The remaining roles are occupied by voice actors Kath Soucie, Amanda Troop, JB Blanc, Susanne Blakeslee and Dave Foquette.

Reception

Unlike the critically acclaimed film, the DS version received "mixed" reviews, while the PlayStation 2 and Wii versions received "unfavorable" reviews, according to the review aggregation website Metacritic. Common Sense Media said that the game is too hard even for adults and it seemed incomplete.

References

External links
 
 

2009 video games
Adventure games
D3 Publisher games
Nintendo DS games
PlayStation 2 games
Video games based on films
Video games based on adaptations
Video games developed in the United States
Video games developed in Japan
Video games featuring female protagonists
Video games about parallel universes
Video games set in Oregon
Wii games
Papaya Studio games
Single-player video games